Amanda Lenhart is a senior research specialist at the Pew Internet & American Life Project who resides in Washington, D.C. She has published numerous articles and research reports, many of which focus on teenagers and their interactions with the internet and other new media technologies.

Education 

Lenhart graduated magna cum laude from Amherst College with a double major in English and Anthropology. Lenhart also holds a Masters in Communications, Culture and Technology from Georgetown University.

Career 

Amanda Lenhart began her career working as the editorial coordinator of Civilization Magazine.

She then began working with the Pew Internet & American Life Project, where she is currently Senior Research Specialist. Lenhart's research work focuses primarily on children, teens, and families. She often writes about young people and how they interact with the web and with different new fads that spring from the evolving technologies.

Lenhart has been a frequent spokesperson on trends in Internet and mobile cell phone use.  In The New York Times, Lenhart was quoted in articles such as "Technology Leapfrogs Schools and Jurisdictions", "Top Kitchen Toy? The Cellphone", and "Tweeting? Odds Are You Live in a City". The Washington Post has cited Lenhart in many articles, including "Sexting hasn't reached most young teens, poll finds", "U.S. teens report 'frightening' levels of texting while driving", and "New Research: Adults & Videogames". In USA Today Lenhart was quoted in articles such as "Survey: Over half of adults, 50% of women play video games", "Survey: Nearly every kid a video gamer", and "Not all :) as informal writing creeps into teen assignments". She has also been interviewed by multiple T.V. and radio sources. In 2003, Lenhart discussed net dropouts on the radio program "On the Media".

In 2006, Amanda Lenhart was a guest on the Talk of The Nation radio show, where she joined social networking researcher danah boyd and Internet safety expert Parry Aftab in a discussion about Myspace. In 2007, Lenhart joined danah boyd, Michele Ybarra, and Dr. David Finkelhor for a luncheon panel for the Advisory Committee to the Congressional Internet Caucus on online youth victimization. CBS cited Lenhart and posted her 2008 discussion with Larry Magid on game-playing. Also in 2008, Lenhart participated in a roundtable at the Association of Internet Researchers' Annual Conference in Copenhagen, including scholars Nancy Baym, Lewis Goodings, Malene Larsen, Raquel Recuero, Jan Schmidt, and Daniel Skog.

In 2009, Lenhart appeared on the "Kojo Nnamdi Show" where she discussed "the opportunities and hazards that come with using social networking sites." She also served as a guest on the radio program "Future Tense", where she discussed sexting. Lenhart has also appeared on "The Exchange", "The Kathleen Dunn Show", and MSNBC's "Countdown with Keith Olbermann".

Writing

Teens 

Much of Lenhart's studies on teenagers focus on how they react to different elements of the technologically based world. She explores topics such as blogging, texting, sexting, cyber bullying, and mobile phones, and relates these to the younger population.

Social networking 
Lenhart has also explored how people of various ages engage in social networking sites.  In an article on social media and young adults, Lenhart specifically looked at the decline in blogging and the simultaneous rise in the use of social networking sites such as Facebook. In a video posted by ABC News, Lenhart discussed the findings from this study.

Web 2.0 and Twitter 
In a presentation titled "Twitter and Status Updating: Demographics, Mobile Access and News Consumption" that was released in October 2009, Lenhart explored how Americans of various ages were utilizing Twitter and other social media.

Web 2.0 and Twitter were also addressed in the Pew report on "Social Media and Young Adults" in 2010.

Sexting and mobile phone use 
Lenhart has contributed reports such as "Teens and Sexting" and an overview of mobile phone use termed "Teens and Mobile Phones Over the Past Five Years: Pew Internet Looks Back".

Melissa Long of the CNN Newsroom interviewed Lenhart in late 2009.

Cyberbullying 
For Lenhart's study on cyberbullying, her team interviewed 935 parent-child pairs and 700 parent-child pairs in 2006 and 2007, respectively. This study and analysis included such topics as harassment, bullying, safety, online usage, and victimization in the technologically advanced world and its findings were organized into a presentation given in 2009.

Gaming 
Lenhart's research into gaming explores how teens and adults have incorporated gaming into their everyday lives.

One report of her findings is "Teens, Video Games and Civics", published in 2008. According to Lenhart, "gaming is nearly universal among teens, with 97% of American youth 12 to 17 playing computer, console, portable or cell phone games." The study found that half of teens play games on any given day, usually for about an hour. The study also noted that "gaming isn’t just the domain of boys - 94% of teen girls play games, as do 99% of teen boys." In a blog entry in which she discussed this study, Lenhart discussed gaming in terms of education and social connections.

Education 
Lenhart's research into education explores how those within the field use technology.

In an article by the Associated Press, she considered emoticons and other informal types of writing that have emerged with new technologies and texting. The title of the article is "Not all :) as informal writing creeps into teen assignments", but Lenhart pointed out that such a slip is "a teachable moment." She stated, "If you find that in a child's or student's writing, that's an opportunity to address the differences between formal and informal writing. They learn to make the distinction ... just as they learn not to use slang terms in formal writing."

Blogs 
In 2010, Lenhart conducted a presentation on the recent findings of blogging as well as other types of technology as they relate to young adults and teenagers.

In particular, Lenhart has discussed the decline of blogging.

Identity 

During a luncheon panel for the Internet Caucus Advisory Committee, Lenhart discussed changes in identity that she sees a related to emergent social networking practices. In other presentations such as "Teens, Online Stranger Contact & Cyberbullying: What the research is telling us", Lenhart notes that understanding the identity needs of young people helps to explain why they participate in certain risk-taking activities online.

Yet she has also noted that young people are learning to utilize digital media, even if those media are currently limited in their ability to fulfill young peoples' identity needs.  As she stated,
However, these new tools seem to ignore a fundamental disconnect between our online and offline identities. In the offline world, we don't present ourselves in the same way to all people in our lives - we show different sides of ourselves to our mothers, our friends, our employers. And even in the age of fine-grained privacy tools, those tools do not eliminate the complexity of figuring out how to best present oneself in a multi-use public space, particularly for those who have personal, professional and family contacts on these sites.

Safety 

In her presentation "Teens, Online Stranger Contact & Cyberbullying: What the research is telling us", Lenhart considered how cyberbullying is understood and discussed among parent-child pairs.  In a podcast by the Safe Internet Alliance, Lenhart joined Linda Criddle (president of Safe Internet Alliance), Nicol Turner-Lee (Vice President & Director of the Media and Technology Institute at the Joint Center for Political and Economic Studies), and David McClure (President & CEO of USIIA) to discuss the changing demographics of online users and the implications of those changes when it comes to safety, providers, and advertisers.

References

External links
 Pew Internet & American Life Project
 Advisory Committee to the Congressional Internet Caucus
 Association of Internet Researchers

Living people
Year of birth missing (living people)
Georgetown University alumni
American family and parenting writers
Amherst College alumni